Thomas "Tom" William Birtwhistle is an Australian Paralympic rower. He was a member of the PR3 Mix 4+ team at the 2020 Tokyo Paralympics.

Personal 
Birtwhistle was born 30 October 1992. He attended Sydney’s St Joseph’s College. In 2010, he was struck by a car whilst cycling to rowing training. This resulted in an impairment to his left hip, leg and sacral pelvis. He completed a Bachelor of Engineering at University of New South Wales in 2013 and Bachelor of Commerce/Bachelor of Engineering, Mechanical and Spatial Information Science at Macquarie University in 2018. In 2021, he works as a Financial Analyst with Lendlease.

Rowing 
He rowed whilst a school but after injuries after being struck by a car led him to stop rowing. He briefly returned to rowing in 2013 but injuries and university studies led him to again cease rowing. The Sydney COVID-19 lockdown in 2020 led him to training on a rowing ergometer and this led to his return to rowing. He rows from the UTS Haberfield Rowing Club in Sydney.

Birtwhistle won the Men'PR3 Single Scull at the 2021 Australian Rowing Championships. He won the PR3 Men’s Single Scull event as part of the International Para-Rowing Regatta, which was run alongside the 2021 Final Paralympic Qualification Regatta in Gavirate, Italy. This qualified him for the 2020 Tokyo Paralympics in PR3 Mix 4+ team.

At the 2020 Summer Paralympics, Birtwhistle was a member of the PR3 Mix 4+ along with James Talbot, Nikki Ayers, Alexandra Viney. Their cox was Renae Domaschenz. They qualified for the final after winning their Repechage with  time of 7:06.98 but came fourth in the final and failed to win a medal.

With Jessica Gallagher, Alexandra Viney, James Talbot and Teesaan Koo under the canvas, Birtwhistle finished fourth in the PR3 Mixed Coxed Four at the 2022 World Rowing Championships.

References

External links 
 
 

1992 births
Living people
Rowers at the 2020 Summer Paralympics
Paralympic rowers of Australia
Australian male rowers
21st-century Australian people
People educated at St Joseph's College, Hunters Hill